Yampa River State Park is a Colorado state park located along the Yampa River in Routt and Moffat Counties in northwestern Colorado in the United States.

Features
Yampa River State Park provides 13 access points for boaters along  of the Yampa River from Hayden to the eastern boundary of Dinosaur National Monument. Walkways and hiking trails explore the river's canyons and riparian zones, surrounding rock formations, and natural habitats.

Campgrounds
A main campground is adjacent to the visitors center.  This campground has 50 campsites including 35 RV electric sites, 10 tent sites, and five sites for group camping. The park also includes less developed campsites near many of the river access points

References

External links
Yampa River State Park Colorado Parks & Wildlife

State parks of Colorado
Protected areas of Moffat County, Colorado
Protected areas of Routt County, Colorado
Protected areas on the Colorado River
Protected areas established in 1998
1998 establishments in Colorado